George VIII may refer to:

George VIII of Georgia (1417–1476)
George VIII of Imereti, western Georgia (died 1726)

See also
 King George (disambiguation)